Pere Marquette State Park is an  protected area in southwestern Jersey County, Illinois, United States.  It is located near the city of Grafton, Illinois, at the confluence of the Mississippi River and the Illinois River.  The park is located on Illinois Route 100, which at this location is also part of both the Great River Road and the Meeting of the Great Rivers Scenic Byway.  The park is operated and maintained by the Illinois Department of Natural Resources, and is Illinois' largest state park in area.  The park is also part of the Confluence Greenway and is at the northwestern end of the  Sam Vadalabene Bike Trail.

History of park
The park was named in honor of Father (Père) Jacques Marquette, a Jesuit priest who was the co-leader, with his comrade Louis Jolliet, of a 1673 voyage of exploration on the Mississippi River.  Marquette was the first European to map the mouth of the Illinois River, which he and Joliet used to return from the Mississippi to the Great Lakes.

At the mouth of the Illinois River, the explorers found one of the richest and most densely settled regions of North America, fully utilized by Native Americans of the Illini Confederacy.  Large catches of fish, shellfish, and waterbirds were yielded from the rivers and adjacent wetlands. On top of the river bluffs, fertile windblown loess and topsoil could be used to grow corn, beans, and squash.

During the years since 1673, many changes have taken place to this region. The beds of mussels and other shellfish have dwindled, harmed by over-harvesting and possible disease. Exotic fish, such as the Asian carps, have swum into the rivers and have partially replaced native species such as largemouth bass, bluegill, catfish, and crappie.

One signature Pere Marquette State Park species, the American bald eagle, has made a remarkable comeback that started in the 1990s. Hundreds of eagles that nest in the wetland areas to the north congregate in and around the park areas in late winter to catch and eat fish during the cold months.

In the late 1950s through 1968 the area just north of the Lover's Leap lookout area was the site of an active Project Nike missile site, constructed for the defense of St. Louis during the Cold War.

Amenities and activities
Pere Marquette State Park was founded in 1931 as the Piasa Bluffs State Park, but was soon renamed. The park's heart is a Civilian Conservation Corps-built lodge, first built in the 1930s and later expanded in 1985 to contain 72 rooms. A visitor center, with exhibits on local ecology and history, opened in 1997. The lodge and surrounding cabins were listed on the National Register of Historic Places in 1985. In celebration of the 2018 Illinois Bicentennial, Pere Marquette Lodge was selected as one of the Illinois 200 Great Places  by the American Institute of Architects Illinois component (AIA Illinois).

Approximately 230 species of bird have been logged in the park, and a horseback riding stable operates during the warmer months. There is also a  public hunting area for deer, squirrel, wild turkey, and other target species. The Illinois River lies adjacent to the western and southern boundaries of the park. There are also several launching ramps for private boats to enter the Illinois and Mississippi Rivers.

The park includes a faulted geologic anticline, an upward arching of stratified rock dated to crustal movement circa 200 million years BP.  The feature is related to the Lincoln Anticline of northeast Missouri.

References

External links

Pere Marquette Lodge & Conference Center
GreatRiverRoad.com
 Pere Marquette Lodge
 Society of Architectural Historians SAH ARCHIPEDIA entry on Pere Marquette Lodge

Civilian Conservation Corps in Illinois
Illinois River
Park buildings and structures on the National Register of Historic Places in Illinois
Protected areas established in 1931
Protected areas of Jersey County, Illinois
Protected areas on the Mississippi River
Rustic architecture in Illinois
State parks of Illinois
National Register of Historic Places in Jersey County, Illinois
1931 establishments in Illinois